Kuga may refer to:

 Ford Kuga, compact sport utility vehicle produced by Ford 
 Kuga (dog), male Belgian Malinois military dog serving with the Australian Army
 Kuga District, Yamaguchi,  district located in Yamaguchi Prefecture, Japan
 Kuga, Gunma, village located in Tone District, northern Gunma Prefecture, Japan
 Kuga fiber variety
 Kuga, Moravče, a former village in the Municipality of Moravče, Slovenia
 Kuga Station,  railway station on the Gantoku Line in Iwakuni, Yamaguchi, Japan
 Kuga Naa, elder in the court of the Yaa Naa, in the Kingdom of Dagbon in northern Ghan
 Kuga, Yamaguchi, town located in Kuga District, Yamaguchi Prefecture, Japan

People 
 Michio Kuga, Japanese  mathematician
 Nikola Kuga, Serbian professional basketball player
 Yoshiko Kuga, Japanese actress
 Kuga Katsunan, pen-name of a journalist in the Meiji period Empire of Japan